Mordellistena grisea is a beetle in the genus Mordellistena of the family Mordellidae. It was described in 1856 by Étienne Mulsant.

References

grisea
Beetles described in 1856